Radhika Apte (born 7 September 1985) is an Indian actress. She works predominantly in Hindi films, and has appeared in a few Tamil, Marathi, Telugu, Bengali, and English-language films. She began acting in theatre and made her film debut with a brief role in the Hindi fantasy, Vaah! Life Ho Toh Aisi! (2005).

Apte's first lead role was in the 2009 Bengali social drama, Antaheen. She gained attention for her supporting roles in three of her 2015 Bollywood productions: Badlapur, the comedy Hunterrr, and the biographical film Manjhi - The Mountain Man. Her leading roles in the 2016 independent films Phobia and Parched earned her acclaim. In 2018, Apte starred in three Netflix productionsthe anthology film Lust Stories, the thriller series Sacred Games, and the horror mini-series Ghoul. She was nominated for an International Emmy Award for her work in the first of these. She has since starred in the Netflix films Raat Akeli Hai (2020) and Monica, O My Darling (2022), and portrayed Noor Inayat Khan in the American film A Call to Spy (2019).

In addition to her work in independent films, Apte has also played the leading lady in mainstream films, such as the Tamil action film Kabali (2016), the Hindi biographical film Pad Man (2018), and the Hindi black comedy Andhadhun (2018), all of which were commercially successful. She has been married to London-based musician, Benedict Taylor, since 2012.

Early life
Radhika Apte was born in a Marathi speaking family on 7 September 1985 in Vellore, Tamil Nadu. Her parents were studying and working as doctors at the Christian Medical College & Hospital, Vellore when she was born. Her father Dr. Charudutt Apte subsequently became a neurosurgeon and chairman of Sahyadri Hospital, Pune. She is an Economics and Mathematics graduate from Fergusson College, Pune. In Pune, she initially studied in a regular school, and then was homeschooled along with four friends by their parents living in the same building, who did not want their children to go through the regular schooling system. Apte found this experience liberating, as it boosted her self-confidence. While growing up in Pune, Apte trained under Kathak exponent, Rohini Bhate, for eight years. It was during this time that Apte became involved in theater in Pune, and decided to go to Mumbai to join films. However, a few months later, Apte got discouraged by her experience in Mumbai and returned to her family in Pune. Apte recounted these times in an interview with Scoop Whoop in 2018, as a learning yet demoralizing experience, wherein she managed with a salary of 8,000 to 10,000 from theater roles and having to put up with odd house owners and roommates in Goregaon, where she lived as a paying guest. During this time, Apte acted in her first film, a Marathi film called "Gho mala asala hawa" (2009). This was followed by her first Hindi film, Shor in the city, after which she acted in Rakta Charitra, Rakta Charitra 2, and "I am".

On returning to Pune, Apte made an overnight decision of going to London for a year, where she studied contemporary dance at London's Trinity Laban Conservatoire of Music and Dance for a year. Apte said her experience in London was life-changing, as she was exposed to a completely different and liberating way of working professionally. There she met her future husband Benedict, who subsequently moved to Pune with her, travelling regularly to Mumbai for his work while Apte still did not want to return to Mumbai because of her earlier experience. After a year, she finally agreed to move to Mumbai, and her second experience in Mumbai was far more positive, as she no longer felt alone.

Career

Early roles (2005–10)
Apte first appeared with a small role in the Hindi film Vaah! Life Ho Toh Aisi! in 2005, a project she did "just for fun" while still in college. Actor Rahul Bose, who had seen Apte perform in Anahita Oberoi's play Bombay Black, suggested her name to director Aniruddha Roy Chowdhury who cast her in his National award-winning Bengali film Antaheen along with Aparna Sen, Sharmila Tagore and Rahul Bose. She played the role of Brinda Roy Menon, a TV journalist, in Antaheen. Riddhima Seal, writing for The Times of India, called Apte a "revelation", further adding "With eyes that speak a thousand words, her passion for work and the loneliness of her heart as she waits to chat every night with that special stranger just strikes the right chord".

In 2009, Apte had her first Indian release, KBC productions' Gho Mala Asla Hava by Sumitra Bhave and Sunil Sukthankar, in which she appeared as Savitri, a village girl. She later collaborated with Bhave and Sukthankar again on the Hindi docufiction Mor Dekhne Jungle Mein. It was in that year that she also worked on Jatin Wagle's Ek Indian Manoos, Reapstar's Life Online, about "a bunch of youngsters working in a BPO" and Amol Palekar's Indian film, Samaantar. In 2010, she was seen in Maneej Premnath's thriller The Waiting Room and later, appeared in a significant role in Ram Gopal Varma's Rakta Charitra and its sequel. On returning from London, Apte was offered a role in a large blockbuster production Hindi film, but was (in her words) kicked out of it, because they felt she was too fat to be in that film.

Breakthrough and rise to prominence (2011–present)

In 2011, Apte appeared in the anthology film I Am and in Shor in the City under Ekta Kapoor's Balaji Motion Pictures. She worked for the third time with the Bhave-Sukthankar duo on Ha Bharat Majha (2012), a film inspired by Anna Hazare's movement that was shot in 14 days and screened at various film festivals. Her two other 2012 releases were Tukaram in Marathi and Dhoni, her maiden Tamil film. For her performance in the latter, she was nominated for SIIMA Award for Best Actress in a Supporting Role.

In 2013, she was seen in the Bengali film Rupkatha Noy. About her character, she said, "I play Sananda, an IT engineer, who is a single mother of a three-year-old child. Sananda had a dreadful past, which keeps haunting her". Apte's first four 2014 releases were Postcard, Pendulum, Legend and Vetri Selvan in three languages – Bengali, Telugu and Tamil, respectively—after which another film of hers, Lai Bhaari, released. Pendulum, which was described by Apte as a "story on magic realism which takes you through multiple layers of parallel realities, or apparent realities", had her playing a working woman in a relationship with a younger man, while in Vetri Selvan, she had played the role of a lawyer. Legend and Lai Bhaari were commercial successes, the latter breaking the opening weekend box office record and becoming the highest grossing Marathi film of all time.

In 2015, Apte gained wider recognition for her roles in six feature films released in the first eight months. In the year's first release, Sriram Raghavan's Badlapur, she had a minor supporting role, for which she shot for six days. Despite appearing only briefly in the latter part of the film, she was widely recognized and appreciated for her performance, with several critics stating that she stood out in the ensemble cast. Rediff's Raja Sen, in particular, wrote that she was "sensational" and featured in "possibly the film's finest" moment. Following a Malayalam release, Haram, her first in the language, and a Telugu release, Lion, she had her next Hindi release, the sex comedy Hunterrr directed by Harshvardhan Kulkarni. Although the film opened to mixed reviews, Apte again earned praise for her performance. While Shubha Shetty-Saha from mid-day.com described her as "excellent in an absolutely realistic role", Filmfare's Rachit Gupta wrote, "While you're at it, hand one (award) to Radhika Apte...She really comes into her own, in a character that's unconventional and full of surprises". With Badlapur and Hunterrr both achieving commercial success and winning Apte critical acclaim, she grew in popularity, breaking into the mainstream Bollywood scene, with the media dubbing her the "latest sensation of Bollywood", Bollywood's new "go-to girl"  and the "new constant in Indian cinema". HuffPost India wrote, "Radhika Apte is on her way to stardom, whether she likes it or not". In late August, two more Hindi films of her, Ketan Mehta's critically acclaimed biogeographical film Manjhi - The Mountain Man, based on Dashrath Manjhi, featuring Apte as Manjhi's wife Falguni Devi, and Kaun Kitne Paani Mein, a satire on water scarcity featuring Apte as an agriculture graduate, released a week apart. Her next film was the Tamil gangster-drama Kabali, in which she was featured as the wife of Rajinikanth. Upon the release, her performance received positive feedback from critics, and the film proved to be a major commercial success as well.

In 2018, Apte co-starred with Akshay Kumar in R. Balki's comedy-drama Pad Man, based on a short story in Twinkle Khanna's book, The Legend of Lakshmi Prasad. It is inspired by the life of Arunachalam Muruganantham from Tamil Nadu, who campaigned for menstrual hygiene in rural India. Apte's role was that of a shy homemaker whose husband (Kumar) invents low-cost sanitary napkins. Saibal Chatterjee of NDTV wrote, "Radhika Apte is, as always, a scene-stealer. She contributes majorly to ensuring that the exchanges between the protagonist and his wife do not veer into corniness."

Apte made her directorial debut with The Sleepwalkers, starring Gulshan Devaiah and Shahana Goswami. The Sleepwalkers is in competition at the Palm Springs International ShortFest 2020, under the Best Midnight Short category.

Among Apte's upcoming films are three Hindi language projects, The Field, the feature debut of Rohit Karn Batra, Leena Yadav's Parched, a U.S.-Indian co-production, and Bombairiya, an Indo – British production  and a Tamil project, Ula.

Theatre
Apte is actively involved with theatre and has been part of several stage plays, mostly in Hindi language. She is associated with Mohit Takalkar's theatre troupe Aasakta Kalamanch in her hometown and has acted in plays like Tu, Purnaviram, Matra Ratra and Samuel Beckett's That Time with Rehan Engineer. She also performed a commercial Hindi play, Kanyadaan, and an English play named Bombay Black. In 2013, she was part of an Indian play named Uney Purey Shahar Ek, which was an adaptation of Girish Karnad's Benda Kaalu on Toast ("Baked Beans of Toast"). She has also stated that she plans to do an English play in London. Apte has said that she prefers to work in experimental theatre.

Short films

Radhika Apte has also acted in a number of short films, including Darmiyan, in which she played a college girl, Ekta, and Vakratunda Swaha, which was filmed by Ashish Avikunthak over a period of 12 years. She played one of the lead roles in Anurag Kashyap's film on eve teasing, That Day After Everyday, which released on YouTube in 2012. She has played the title role in Sujoy Ghosh's 2015 Bengali short film Ahalya.

Personal life
Apte met Benedict Taylor in 2011 in London during her year-long sabbatical when she had gone to learn contemporary dance. Director Sarang Sathaye, a friend of Radhika, in October 2012, said that the two had been living together since a long time and that a registered marriage took place a month before the official ceremony was said to be held in March 2013.
 
Apte has spoken out against sexual harassment in the Indian film industry. She supported the MeToo movement in India, stating that she was hopeful that it could bring about a change if enough major industry figures were to participate.

Filmography

Films

Short films

Television

Theatre

Awards

References

External links

 
 
 

1985 births
Living people
Actresses from Pune
People from Vellore
Indian film actresses
Indian television actresses
Indian stage actresses
Actresses in Hindi cinema
Actresses in Bengali cinema
Actresses in Marathi cinema
Actresses in Tamil cinema
Actresses in Telugu cinema
Actresses in Malayalam cinema
Actresses in Hindi television
Actresses in Marathi theatre
Indian expatriate actresses in the United Kingdom
Indian expatriate actresses in the United States
Fergusson College alumni
Savitribai Phule Pune University alumni
Alumni of Trinity Laban Conservatoire of Music and Dance
21st-century Indian actresses